A Kiss In A Taxi is a lost 1927 American silent comedy film starring Bebe Daniels and directed by Clarence Badger. It is based on a French play, A Kiss in a Taxi, produced on Broadway in 1925. Famous Players-Lasky produced and Paramount Pictures distributed.

Cast
Bebe Daniels as Ginette
Chester Conklin as Maraval
Douglas Gilmore as Lucien Cambolle
Henry Kolker as Leon Lambert
Richard Tucker as Henri Le Sage
Agostino Borgato as Pierre
Eulalie Jensen as Valentine Lambert
Rose Burdick as Gay Lady
Jocelyn Lee as Secretary

Plot
Bebe Daniels plays Ginette A waitress at Pierre's Café. She is in love with a poor artist named Lucien despite Lucien’s father's disapproval of their relationship, and rejects the affection of all other men. Whenever another man tries to kiss her she begins angrily breaking glassware. Patrons of the café find this behavior very amusing. A patron of the café named Leon Lambert decides to make an attempt to kiss Ginette. Later in the film Leon Lambert and "a gay lady" are traveling through town by taxi when they decide to stop at a florists shop. At the same time Ginette, in an attempt to get away from her irate employer, runs down the street and into the waiting taxi. Leon returns to the taxi and offers a bouquet of flowers to Ginette. With the taxi leaving the florist Leon attempts to force a kiss on Ginnette. In response Ginette strikes Leon in the face. This commotion causes the cab driver to lose control of the taxi and crash through the front window of the café. Leon Lambert offers to buy the café for Ginette, expecting her gratitude. He accidentally uses the card of Maraval, a treasurer for the Artists' Society. To get out of the situation Leon poses as Ginettes father and with the help of his friend Henri attempts to make Maravel pursue Ginette as a lover. After all complications are resolved Ginette and Lucien finally reunite and are able to be together.

Reception
A Kiss In A Taxi received generally positive reviews from critics upon its release. Much of this praise was directed to the performances of its cast. In The Healdsburg Tribune it was stated of Bebe Daniels in the role of Ginette. "The dark eyed star presents one of the best characterizations of her career". The same article said "Brilliant support is accorded by Chester Conklin, Douglas Gilmore, her new leading man, Jocelyn Lee, Henry Kolker and Richard Tucker". The humor of the movie received attention from reviewers, namely the large amounts of glassware shattered throughout the movie for comedic effect. The movie also received praise for its more action filled moments, The Healdsburg Tribune stated referring to the scene of the taxi crashing through the café wall "This brief action represents one of the most exciting bits of screen photography ever recorded".

References

External links

lobby poster (Wayback Machine)

American silent feature films
Films directed by Clarence G. Badger
American films based on plays
Paramount Pictures films
1927 comedy films
Silent American comedy films
American black-and-white films
Films set in France
Lost American films
1927 lost films
Lost comedy films
1920s American films
1920s English-language films